Idyll in Budapest (Italian: Idillio a Budapest) is a 1941 Italian comedy film directed by Giorgio Ansoldi and Gabriele Varriale and starring Germaine Aussey, Osvaldo Valenti and Sergio Tofano.

It was shot at the Pisorno Studios in Tirrenia. The film's sets were designed by the art director Marcello Avenati.

Cast
 Germaine Aussey as Rosy 
 Osvaldo Valenti as Sandor 
 Sergio Tofano as Altezza 
 Inge Dawry as Paolina
 Giulio Alfieri
 Elena Altieri
 Arnaldo Arnaldi
 Liana Del Balzo
 Adele Garavaglia
 Fausto Guerzoni
 Loredana
 Renato Malavasi
 Evelina Paoli
 Michele Riccardini

References

Bibliography 
 Chiti, Roberto & Poppi, Roberto. I film: Tutti i film italiani dal 1930 al 1944. Gremese Editore, 2005.

External links 
 

1941 films
Italian comedy films
Italian black-and-white films
1941 comedy films
Films set in Budapest
1940s Italian films